The borough of West Chester, Pennsylvania, was established in 1762 and incorporated in 1799. The population in the 2010 census was 18,461. Notable residents or those who were born in West Chester are listed below.

Academics, science, and literature 

 Ellen Starr Brinton (1886–1954), Quaker; internationalist; feminist; early leader of Women's International League for Peace and Freedom
 Howard Brinton, educator, philosopher, and director of Pendle Hill Quaker Center for Study and Contemplation
 Gilbert Cope (1840–1928), historian and genealogist
 James David Corrothers (1869–1917), African American poet and minister
 Benjamin Matlack Everhart, mycologist
 Joseph Hergesheimer, novelist
 Josiah Hoopes (1832–1904), botanist and nurseryman
 William W. Jefferis (1820–1906), mineralogist and banker
 Bruce Larkin, children's book author
 Clara Marshall, physician, educator, and dean of the Woman’s Medical College of Pennsylvania
 George Foot Moore, scholar of the Bible, Judaism, and comparative religions
 G. Raymond Rettew, chemist who pioneered the mass production of penicillin
 Joseph Rothrock, botanist and environmentalist, died in West Chester in 1922
 George Escol Sellers, inventor; resided here as child attending private school
 Bayard Taylor, poet
 David Townsend (1787–1858), botanist and banker
 Mary Schäffer Warren (1861–1939), American-Canadian explorer and botanical illustrator
 William H. Whyte, sociologist

Art 

 Tom Bostelle (1925–2005), painter and sculptor
 George Cope, painter
 Horace Pippin, painter

Entertainment 

 Aquaria (b. 1996), drag queen, winner of RuPaul's Drag Race, Season 10
 Samuel Barber (1910–1981), musical composer
 CKY, rock band
 CKY crew, group of skateboarders and stuntmen
Brandon DiCamillo, reality television personality
 Ryan Dunn, reality television personality
Kyle Gallner, actor
John Lilley (b. 1954), guitarist for The Hooters
April Margera, reality television personality
Bam Margera, professional skateboarder and television personality
Jess Margera, drummer
Phil Margera, reality television personality
Vincent Margera, "Don Vito", reality television personality
Matisyahu, rapper and singer
Charlie McDermott, actor
Matthew McGrory, actor
Chris Raab, reality television personality
Graham Rogers, actor
Kerr Smith, actor
Amy Steel, actress
Morgan Turner, actress
Noel Jan Tyl, opera singer and astrologer
Rake Yohn, reality television personality
Zeeko Zaki, actor
Richard Zobel, actor

Politics, government, military, and law 

Isaac D. Barnard (1791–1834), U.S. Senator for Pennsylvania, Pennsylvania State Senator
Harry W. Bass (1866–1917), first African American member of the Pennsylvania House of Representatives
Thomas S. Bell (1800–1861), Pennsylvania State Senator and justice of the Pennsylvania Supreme Court
 Thomas S. Bell Jr. (1838–1862), Union Army lieutenant colonel killed in action at the Battle of Antietam
 Smedley Butler (1881–1940), U.S. Marine Corps, two-time Medal of Honor recipient and anti-war activist
 Henry Conner, member of the Wisconsin State Senate
 Isabel Darlington (1865–1950), lawyer and the first woman to practice law in Chester County
 William Darlington, botanist and United States House of Representatives member
 James Bowen Everhart, U.S House of Representatives member, Pennsylvania state senator
 William Everhart, U.S. House of Representatives member
Henry Ruhl Guss (1825–1907), Union Army brevet Major General
John Hannum III (1744–1799), militia colonel in the American Revolutionary War
 Joseph Hemphill, U.S. Congressman, practiced law in West Chester
 Moses Hepburn, first African American town councilor of West Chester
John Hickman, U.S. Congressman
 Francis James, U.S Congressman
Walter T. Kerwin Jr., United States Army four-star general
Dewitt Clinton Lewis, Medal of Honor recipient
Henry McIntire (1835–1863), Union Army lieutenant colonel
Charles R. Miller, 54th governor of Delaware
Jonathan Lee Riches, lawyer and fraudster
David M. Rodriguez, General, U.S. Army Forces Command
George Fairlamb Smith (1840–1877), Union Army colonel, Pennsylvania state representative, and Chester County district attorney
Theobald Wolfe Tone, Irish Republican
Washington Townsend, U.S. House of Representatives member
Cristin McCarthy Vahey, member of the Connecticut House of Representatives
Wilmer Worthington, physician and Speaker of the Pennsylvania State Senate in 1869

Sports 

 Eric Bernotas (b. 1981), skeleton athlete, coach and double Winter Olympian
 Norman Braman (b. 1932), former owner of NFL's Philadelphia Eagles
Al Bruno (1927–2014), football player and coach
Stephen Dennis (b. 1987), basketball player for Bnei Herzliya of the Israeli Basketball Premier League
Jim Furyk, professional golfer, 2003 U.S. Open champion
Phil Gosselin, Major League baseball player
 Brandon Guyer, Major League Baseball player
Jeff Larentowicz, professional soccer player
Jim Liberman, auto racing driver
Jon Matlack, Major League Baseball pitcher
Chas McCormick (born 1995), baseball player
Aiden McFadden (born 1998), soccer player
Muffet McGraw, women's basketball coach, 2001 NCAA champion, member of Basketball Hall of Fame
Bridget Namiotka (born 1990), pair skater
Carl Nassib, defensive end for the Las Vegas Raiders
Ryan Nassib, National Football League quarterback
Brandon Novak, professional skateboarder
Sean O'Hair, professional golfer
Kevin Orie, Major League Baseball player
Glen Osbourne, professional wrestler
Matt Schaub, National Football League quarterback
Bud Sharpe, Major League Baseball player
Lawrence Shields, runner, Olympic bronze medalist

Other 
 Nick Berg, repairman beheaded in Iraq
 Ralph E. Brock, forester and gardener
 Emma Hunter, telegraph operator
 Anna Jarvis, founder of Mother's Day holiday in the United States
Bayard Rustin, civil rights activist
Philip M. Sharples, inventor and industrialist
Mary Ingram Stille, historian, journalist, and temperance reformer
Geralyn Wolf, Episcopal bishop

References

 
West Chester, Pennsylvania
West Chester